James Seaton may refer to:

 James Seaton (professor) (1944–2017), professor of English at Michigan State University
 James Seaton (Newfoundland politician) (1804–1876), journalist and political figure in Newfoundland
 James Seaton (New Zealand politician) (1822–1882), member of parliament from Dunedin, New Zealand
 James Seaton (bishop) (1868–1938), Anglican bishop
 James Wilson Seaton (1824–1904), American lawyer and legislator
 Jimmy Seaton (1891–1959), Australian rules footballer

See also
James Seton (disambiguation)